The 1944 Amateur World Series was the seventh Amateur World Series (AWS), an international men's amateur baseball tournament. The tournament was sanctioned by the International Baseball Federation (which titled it the Baseball World Cup as of the 1988 tournament). The tournament took place, for the first  time, in Venezuela. It was contested by four national teams playing twelve games each from October 12 through November 18 in Caracas.  Venezuela won their second AWS title, though in controversial fashion.

Controversy surrounded the tournament with umpiring decisions. The Dominican Republic led Venezuela going into the 9th. In the top of the inning, Venezuela rallied to take the lead. In the bottom of the inning, the umpire called the game early due to bad light, reverting the 9th inning and making the Dominican Republic the winner.

More controversial umpiring played a role in a Cuba–Venezuela game in the final phase of the event. After a Venezuelan errored the ball during a close play at first, a photographer came over and threw the ball to one of the Venezuelan players, which led to an out. The Cuban manager protested the call and was told by the umpires that photographers were allowed to intervene in play. Due to this, Cuba withdrew from the Cup and their remaining game was forfeited; they were credited with a third-place finish nonetheless.

Cuba's withdrawal was closely followed by that of Mexico, who also withdrew from the tournament after more controversial umpiring decisions in favour of Venezuela, forfeiting the final round and finishing second.

Standings
First round

Second round

Final round

 * Venezuela won by forfeit.

Statistics

References
Bjarkman, P. A History of Cuban Baseball
World Cup History

Amateur World Series, 1944
Baseball World Cup
1940
1944 in Venezuelan sport
September 1944 sports events
October 1944 sports events
Sports competitions in Caracas
20th century in Caracas